An outdoor life-size sculpture of Chief Seattle by local artist James  is installed in Tilikum Place in Seattle, Washington, in the United States.

Description
The copper statue, which weighs between 300 and 400 lbs. (136–181 kg), shows Seattle with his right hand extended as if in greeting.  The statue stands atop a stone base that was designed to serve as a fountain, although the fountain has been turned off and on over the years.

History

Commissioned in 1907, 's design suffered from multiple poor castings and was finally sent to New York for casting. The statue was formally unveiled in Tilikum Place by Myrtle Loughery, a great-great-granddaughter of Chief Seattle, on November 13, 1912. The statue was the first commissioned in Seattle and only the city's second piece of public art in all.

After unsuccessful proposals to move the statue to locations such as Duwamish Head, Denny Park, and Pioneer Square, the statue was removed for cleaning in anticipation of the Century 21 Exposition of 1962.  objected to a proposal to turn the statue around so it would face the then-new Seattle Center Monorail. After its cleaning, the statue was returned to its original location and orientation, facing Elliott Bay.

The statue was rededicated on December 8, 1975. By 1980, the statue had turned green. A local taxi driver attempted to clean it himself, scratching it and exposing its original bronze color. A subsequent restoration revealed that the statue originally had been gilded (covered in gold leaf). It was added to the National Register of Historic Places on April 19, 1984, and named a city landmark on May 6, 1985.

See also
 1912 in art
 National Register of Historic Places listings in Seattle
 Native Americans in popular culture

References

1910s in Seattle
1912 establishments in Washington (state)
1912 sculptures
Belltown, Seattle
Copper sculptures in the United States
Fountains in Washington (state)
Monuments and memorials on the National Register of Historic Places in Washington (state)
Monuments and memorials in Seattle
National Register of Historic Places in Seattle
Outdoor sculptures in Seattle
Sculptures of men in Washington (state)
Sculptures of Native Americans in Washington (state)
Statues in Seattle